Araia may refer to:

Araia, Álava, a town in Álava, Basque Country, Spain
Francesco Araja, also known as Francesco Araia
ARAIA, Associate of the (Royal) Australian Institute of Architects

See also
 Araya (disambiguation)